Ping Shan San Tsuen is a village in Ping Shan, Yuen Long District, Hong Kong.

Administration
Ping Shan San Tsuen is a recognized village under the New Territories Small House Policy.

History
Ping Shan San Tsuen is one of the three wais (walled villages) and six tsuens (villages) established by the Tang Clan of Ping Shan, namely: Sheung Cheung Wai, Kiu Tau Wai, Fui Sha Wai, Hang Tau Tsuen, Hang Mei Tsuen, Tong Fong Tsuen, Ping Shan San Tsuen, Hung Uk Tsuen and San Hei Tsuen.

At the time of the 1911 census, the population of San Tsuen was 50. The number of males was 22.

See also
 Ping Shan Heritage Trail

References

External links

 Delineation of area of existing village Ping Shan San Tsuen (Ping Shan) for election of resident representative (2019 to 2022)

Villages in Yuen Long District, Hong Kong
Ping Shan